λ Coronae Australis, Latinized as Lambda Coronae Australis is a binary star system located in the southern constellation of Corona Australis. It is visible to the naked eye as a faint, white-hued point of light with an apparent visual magnitude of 5.11. The system is located at a distance of 205 light-years, based on parallax, and is drifting further away with a radial velocity of −26 km/s.

The primary member of this system, designated component A, is an A-type main-sequence star with a stellar classification of A0/1V. It is 273 million years old and is spinning with a projected rotational velocity of 149 km/s. This high rotation rate is producing an equatorial bulge that is 7% larger than the polar radius. It has 2.17 times the mass of the Sun and 2.24 times the Sun's radius. The star is radiating 31 times the Sun's luminosity from its photosphere at an effective temperature of 8,609 K.

The secondary companion, component B, has an apparent visual magnitude of 10.01 and a class of K0. Component C is a visual companion of magnitude 9.9 and separation  from the primary.

References 

Corona Australis, Lambda
Binary stars
Corona Australis
Corona Australis, Lambda
Durchmusterung objects
172777
091875
7021